Orientales dethroned four-time champion Industriales to win their only Cuban National Series championship. Four teams finished within three games of first place, as Las Villas and Granjeros limped to the finish line.

Standings

References

 (Note - text is printed in a white font on a white background, depending on browser used.)

Cuban National Series seasons
Cuban National Series
1966 in Cuban sport
1967 in Cuban sport